Frank Crowley may refer to:

Frank Crowley (athlete) (1909–1980), American middle- and long-distance runner
Frank Crowley (politician) (1939–2022), Irish Fine Gael politician from Cork